In functional analysis, a reflexive operator algebra A is an operator algebra that has enough invariant subspaces to characterize it. Formally, A is reflexive if it is equal to the algebra of bounded operators which leave invariant each subspace left invariant by every operator in A.

This should not be confused with a reflexive space.

Examples 

Nest algebras are examples of reflexive operator algebras. In finite dimensions, these are simply algebras of all matrices of a given size whose nonzero entries lie in an upper-triangular pattern.

In fact if we fix any pattern of entries in an n by n matrix containing the diagonal, then the set of all n by n matrices whose nonzero entries lie in this pattern forms a reflexive algebra.

An example of an algebra which is not reflexive is the set of 2 × 2 matrices

This algebra is smaller than the Nest algebra

but has the same invariant subspaces, so it is not reflexive.

If T is a fixed n by n matrix then the set of all polynomials in T and the identity operator forms a unital operator algebra. A theorem of Deddens and Fillmore states that this algebra is reflexive if and only if the largest two blocks in the Jordan normal form of T differ in size by at most one. For example, the algebra

which is equal to the set of all polynomials in

and the identity is reflexive.

Hyper-reflexivity 

Let  be a weak*-closed operator algebra contained in B(H), the set of all bounded operators on a Hilbert space H and for T any operator in B(H), let

The algebra  is reflexive if and only if for every T in B(H):

We note that for any T in B(H) the following inequality is satisfied:

Here  is the distance of T from the algebra, namely the smallest norm of an operator T-A where A runs over the algebra. We call  hyperreflexive if there is a constant K such that for every operator T in B(H),

A hyper-reflexive operator algebra is automatically reflexive.

In the case of a reflexive algebra of matrices with nonzero entries specified by a given pattern, the problem of finding the distance constant can be rephrased as a matrix-filling problem: if we fill the entries in the complement of the pattern with arbitrary entries, what choice of entries in the pattern gives the smallest operator norm?

Examples 

 Every finite-dimensional reflexive algebra is hyper-reflexive. However, there are examples of infinite-dimensional reflexive operator algebras which are not hyper-reflexive.
 The distance constant for a one-dimensional algebra is 1.
 Nest algebras are hyper-reflexive with distance constant 1.
 Many von Neumann algebras are hyper-reflexive, but it is not known if they all are.
 A type I von Neumann algebra is hyper-reflexive with distance constant at most 2.

See also 
Invariant subspace
subspace lattice
reflexive subspace lattice
nest algebra

References 

 William Arveson, Ten lectures on operator algebras,  
 H. Radjavi and P. Rosenthal, Invariant Subspaces, 

Operator theory
Operator algebras
Invariant subspaces